Aladağ is a village in Tarsus district of Mersin Province, Turkey. At  it is situated in Çukurova (Cilicia of the antiquity) plains to the east of Turkish state highway . The population of Aladağ  is 263 as of 2011.

References

Villages in Tarsus District